Ghigi was an Italian professional cycling team that existed from 1958 to 1962, leading to the formation of the Salvarani team in 1963. Its main sponsor was Italian pasta manufacturer Ghigi.

References

External links

Cycling teams based in Italy
Defunct cycling teams based in Italy
1958 establishments in Italy
1962 disestablishments in Italy
Cycling teams established in 1958
Cycling teams disestablished in 1962